Marek Wojciech Niedźwiecki (born March 24, 1954 in Sieradz, Poland) is a Polish music journalist and radio anchor.

Early life

Family  

Marek Niedźwiecki comes from a small city Szadek, with the population of about 2000, situated in central Poland in Łódź voivodeship, 36 km from Łódź. 
His father, Wojciech Niedźwiedzki (30.01.1912 – 24.12.1993), was a butcher by profession and worked as the manager in the local food industry cooperative "". His mother Kazimiera (Kopeć) Niedźwiedzka (10.12.1926 – 25.04.2015) came from a farmers’ family residing in the village of Policzko and was a history teacher at Tadeusz Kościuszko Primary School in Szadek. Kazimiera Kopeć was the second wife of Wojciech Niedźwiecki, the first one died of cancer. 
His grandparents on his mother's side, Zofia and Franciszek Kopeć lived in Policzko their whole life. As a child, Marek Niedźwiecki lived with his parents and his grandparents on his father's side:  Leokadia i Wincenty Niedźwiedzcy.
He has one older sister Małgorzata (born 1952) and two younger brothers (twins) Piotr and Wojciech (born 11.10.1956). Piotr Niedźwiecki is the president of the city of Zduńska Wola.

Name 

The difference in parents’ name spelling is not a mistake. Originally, the family name was spelled with "dz". 
Marek Niedźwiecki explains it: "When my older sister was applying to University, it turned out that in some of her school reports the name was spelled Niedźwiedzka with <<dz>> and in some others – with <<c>>. For her to be accepted at University, it had to be unified. Apparently, it was easier and shorter to spell the name with <<c>>. So, in my birth certificate the name is spelled with <<dz>> but I am actually Niedźwiecki with <<c>>."

Education 

Tadeusz Kościuszko Primary and Junior High School (formerly Karol Świerczewski Primary School) in Szadek, Prusinowska Street 4 (formerly Warszawska Street 2) 

John Paul II Secondary School №2 (formerly Małgorzata Fornalska Primary and Secondary School №33) in Zduńska Wola, Komisji Edukacji Narodowej Street 6 (formerly Jasna 2) 

Lodz University of Technology, The Faculty of Civil Engineering, Architecture and Environmental Engineering, master's dissertation topic: "The technology and construction organisation of the trading pavilion SPS1300", defended 24.03.1979.

Private life

Marek Niedźwiecki is a bit superstitious and believes in numerology.  On 9 September 2009 (09.09.09) he visited the village of Policzko, where he used to spend summer holidays as a small child. Entries on his blog traditionally appear at 19.54 which is the year of his birth. When he forgets something and has to come back home, he usually sits for a moment, and leaving the house he always leaves a hanger on the bed.

He claims to have been a rickshaw driver in Calcutta in his previous life 

He got his driving licence in January 1978 and since then has driven two Fiats, one Renault, one Golf and four Hondas (a chocolate CRV now).

Marek Niedźwiecki has been given many awards, such as the Golden Microphone in 1993, The Gold Cross of Merit (Polish: Złoty Krzyż Zasługi) in 2000  and The Officer's Cross of the Order of Polonia Restituta (Polish: Order Odrodzenia Polski, English: Order of Rebirth of Poland) in 2011.

In 2007 he had a benign tumor removed from his ear. This experience changed his attitude to life. "When it turned out to be just a benign pimple, I felt like in the song by Kazik: "I came back from the land of the dead". I got my strength back and I promised myself not to break down in similar situations. I also started to concentrate more on everyday pleasures."

He has never married and is not planning to do so. "I have never wanted to get into relationship, have a burden of wife and kids. I knew I couldn't handle it. [...] I wanted to be alone. And nothing has changed since then."

Professional career

Students’ Radio "Żak", Lodz University of Technology, Łodź, 1973 – 1980 

The beginning of Marek Niedźwiecki's radio career is connected to the fact that his older sister studied at Lodz University of Technology (at the Faculty of Material Technologies and Textile Design) and she was the one to tell him about the existence of the students’ radio. As Marek Niedźwiecki had dreamed about becoming a radio journalist since early childhood, the idea of studying there to be able to work in the students' radio, came to him immediately.

Students' Radio "Żak" was the station where Marek Niedźwiecki started to make his first Radio Charts. As the radio range covered only the University of Technology dormitories, the listeners and the voters were only students. Special letter boxes for votes were placed in all the dormitories, the votes were collected up until Thursday night, and the Charts was emitted on Friday.

Students’ Radio "Żak" and its Charts were the first to give Marek Niedźwiecki some popularity. He recalls the times with sentiment: "I like those beginnings of mine. I don’t distance myself from them. Now in the programme "Markomania" I do a small window – Radio Luxemburg Charts from 40 years before – so I play those things that I used to play in "Żak". It's really nice for me, because I read the charts and in my mind I am watching a film from the past: I recall what I played then, what I looked like, what new songs appeared, which ones disappeared."

Polish Radio Łódź, Łódź, 1.05.1978 – 1982 

His first contact with  Polish Radio Łódź Marek Niedźwiecki established through Józef Wojcieszczyk and his programme "Students’ and Factories’ Radio", where first he appeared as a guest talking about Students’ Radio "Żak" and later on, preparing music for other programs of the series.

In April 1978 the station opened the post of the radio linkman for competition and Marek Niedźwiecki won. Apart from announcing the programmes currently on air, he also started preparing his own programmes, the most popular of which turned out to be "Discorama" in cooperation with Małgorzata Kamińska.

Polish Radio Three, Warsaw, 1.04.1982 – 31.07.2007 

At the end of March 1982 Marek Niedźwiecki received a message that Polskie Radio Program III (reorganised because of the Martial Law introduced in Poland a few months before) wants to employ him. The manager, Andrzej Turski, offered him the full–time job, mainly to create Polish Radio Three Charts.

In this period of time, apart from Radio Three Charts, Marek Niedźwiecki also worked as a presenter in such programmes as "Zapraszamy do Trójki", "W tonacji Trójki" and "Pół perfekcyjnej płyty". He was the creator of music programmes "Markomania", "Frutti di Marek" and "Chillout Cafe"(with Agnieszka Szydłowska).

Radio "Złote Przeboje", Warsaw, 1.12.2007 - 1.04 2010 

Although Polish Radio Three had been his dream work-place, in 2007 Marek Niedźwiecki decided to change the radio station and start working for Radio Złote Przeboje.

This is what he says to justify his decision, which created a lot of turmoil, especially among fans: "I thought I was changing the radio station because I got offended by what was happening in Polish Radio Three at that moment. Radio Three Charts was about to celebrate its 25th anniversary and we were planning a big concert at Agrykola Stadium, but Krzysztof Skowroński, who was the CEO at the time, said that the concert was not to take place because it would be associated with the 25th anniversary of Martial Law. He also thought up these three-hour-long concerts on Friday mornings which meant that my programme "W tonacji Trójki" lasted 18 minutes instead of an hour."

In Radio Złote Przeboje Marek Niedźwiecki had three programmes: The Charts, "Złote, słodsze, najsłodsze" and "Top Wszech Czasów", all three similar to the ones he used to have in Polish Radio Three.

Polish Radio Three, Warsaw, 1.04 2010 - 17.05.2020 

Following the change in the management of Polish Radio Three, Marek Niedźwiecki decided to come back to his dream radio station. In all the interviews he always underlines that coming back to Polish Radio Three was like coming home.

From this moment until 17.05.2020 Marek Niedźwiecki had several programmes throughout the week. On Mondays we could listen to him in the programme "Do południa" (9.00 – 12.00), on Thursday "W Tonacji Trójki" (15.00 – 16.00, later 14.00 - 15.00), on Friday either in LP3 (9.00 – 12.00) or The Charts (19.00 – 22.00) and sometimes in both, and on Saturday in "Markomania" (11.00 – 13.00). Also, he occasionally presented specific type of music, very calming and thought-provoking, before Easter (on Good Friday) and around All Saints Day (1 November) instead of The Charts.

On 15.05.2020 the song "Twój ból jest lepszy niż mój" (Your pain is better than mine) sung by Kazik Staszewski debuted on the Charts, on the first position. The song critically referred to the visit of the member of Polish Parliament Jarosław Kaczyński on the cemetery, which he did against the current law prohibiting such practices because of the COVID-19 pandemic. The next day the management of Polish Radio 3 annulled this particular Charts 1998, claiming that the song had appeared from outside the Charts and the results had been manipulated. On Sunday, 17.05.2020, Marek Niedźwiecki issued an announcement: "Due to the accusations of dishonesty in preparing my programme I resign from cooperating with Polish Radio 3"

Radio 357, Warsaw, currently 

Now Niedźwiedzki works at Radio 357, a crowdfunded internet radio made by him and different journalists who left Trójka.

Cooperation 

Marek Niedźwiecki also cooperated/cooperates with Polish Radio One, TVP2, RTL7, MTV Classic, nPremium HD, Canal+, Radio Smooth Jazz Cafe (on YouTube), Filipinka, Wietrzne Radio, Radionewsletter, Edukacja Filmowa.

Polish Radio Three Charts 

One of the most famous quotes from Marek Niedźwiecki is "The Charts is the most important thing that happened in my life. I think that nothing more interesting can ever happen to me."

Created in 1982, Lista Przebojów Programu Trzeciego got immediate popularity. The first edition was broadcast on 24 April, but a week before Marek Niedźwiecki presented a set of songs for the listeners to choose from. The first number one was "I’ll find my way home" by Jon & Vangelis.

Throughout the years the time and day of The Charts broadcast changed, it was Saturday or Friday – each twice, between 20.00 and 22.00, 18.00 – 22.00 and 19.00 – 22.00. Now it is emitted every Friday, from 19.00 till 22.00.

Originally, Marek Niedźwiecki was the only host of The Charts. In the times of his illness or holiday he was replaced by a number of people, hosting from one to thirty one programmes and including such popular names as Wojciech Mann, Piotr Kaczkowski, Piotr Metz, Piotr Stelmach, Grzegorz Miecugow or Kuba Strzyczkowski.  When Marek Niedźwiecki left for Radio Złote Przeboje, Piotr Baron became the host. After his coming back, he and Piotr Baron host The Charts in turns, and the one not hosting The Charts in the given week, hosts the morning programme LP3 in which songs from The Charts (both current and archival) are presented.

First the votes were sent on postcards or dictated on the phone by the listeners, since April 1996 voting has been done by the Internet. The number of votes per person changed from two in the beginning to ten nowadays. The Charts used to include 20 songs, then 30, 40, now it is 50 divided into two parts: the so-called "waiting room" (only a small part of each song is presented) and the basic list (the songs going up are presented in full).

The Charts used to have many interludes such as short reports from the Netherlands, the USA, France, "letters from fans" (which at the beginning weren’t actual letters at all, they were all made up, but people took to this idea immediately and started writing real letters to Maria Teodorowicz, who presented those  ), news from the music world, chats with Polish music stars and a huge collection of jingles introducing different parts of the programme. The most recognisable, and still used, is the song "The look of love" by ABC and the voice of a little boy named Czarek who says "goodbye" in a very cute way – both usually played at the end of the programme. Marek Niedźwiecki also uses mails from the listeners during the programme, organises quizzes, sometimes invites guests (usually musicians) and before the 10th position on The Charts there are a few minutes for Helen (Halina Wachowicz), who gives the results of the quizzes or just chats with the host.

From time to time, The Charts takes place outside the studio. "The Charts on location" is especially popular among fans because it gives them the possibility to watch Marek Niedźwiecki at work, but Marek Niedźwiecki himself considers it a really bad idea: "In my opinion, we, in Radio Three, didn’t manage to find a suitable solution, so that it would be interesting for the people who come to the events outside the studio, and, at the same time, for the listeners, who are much bigger in number. Usually, it turns out to be a neverending collection of listeners’ greetings for aunts or uncles – which is extremely important for some thirty people shaking with emotion, but for the people next to the radio sets – they feel like puking." Nevertheless, starting from 25 August 1995 in Gdańsk, The Charts has visited many cities and towns all over Poland, the most popular being Szklarska Poręba, the winter capital of Polish Radio Three.

The whole set of The Charts outside the studio, hosted by Marek Niedźwiecki (time, place, Charts’ number):

 25 August 1995 – Gdańsk (708)
 15 June 2001 – Szklarska Poręba (1011).
 14 September 2001 – Szklarska Poręba (1024)
 7 December 2001 – Szklarska Poręba (1036)
 3 May 2002 – Szklarska Poręba (1057, 20 Years’ Top)
 5 July 2002 – Szklarska Poręba (1066)
 12 July 2002 – Augustów (1067)
 19 July 2002 – Władysławowo (1068)
 4 July 2003 – Szklarska Poręba (1118)
 1 August 2003 – Augustów (1122)
 15 August 2003 – Sopot (1124)
 11 June 2004 – Szklarska Poręba (1167)
 16 July 2004 – Augustów (1172)
 4 March 2005 – Szklarska Poręba (1205, the summary countdown of previous 1200 countdowns)
 15 July 2005 – Szklarska Poręba (1224)
 22 July 2005 – Augustów (1225)
 20 January 2006 – Zakopane (1251, Top of the year 2005)
 16 June 2006 – Szklarska Poręba (1272)
 14 July 2006 – Łeba (1276)
 25 August 2006 – Sopot (1282)
 9 February 2007 – Zakopane (1306)
 9 March 2007 – Sydney, Australia (1310)
 25 May 2007 – Legnica (1321)
 13 July 2007 – Muczne, The Bieszczady Mountains (1328)
 20 July 2007 – Szklarska Poręba (1329)
 4 June 2010 – Szklarska Poręba (1479)
 6 August 2010 – Augustów (1488)
 18 February 2011 – Szklarska Poręba (1516)
 15 July 2011 – Augustów (1537)
 29 July 2011 – Wrocław (1539)
 2 September 2011 –  Gdynia (1544)
 22 June 2012 – Sopot (1586)
 20 July 2012 – Wrocław (1590)
 12 July 2013 – Darłowo (1641)
 2 August 2013 – Szklarska Poręba (1644)
 23 August 2013 – Bolesławiec (1647)
 20 September 2013 – Sopot (1651)
 6 December 2013 – National Stadium Warsaw, together with Piotr Baron (1662)
 2 May 2014 – Sopot (1683)
 13 June 2014 – Brzeziny (1689)
 11 July 2014 – Darłowo (1693)
 18 July 2014 – Wałcz (notowanie nr 1694)
 3 October 2014 – Cracow (1705)
 13 February 2015 – Szklarska Poręba (1724)
 17 April 2015 – Wrocław (1733)
 25 September 2015 – Bydgoszcz (1756)
 4 December 2015 – Central Railway Station Warsaw (1766)
 12 February 2016 – Szklarska Poręba (1776)
 20 May 2016 - Dublin
 17 February 2017 - Szklarska Poręba
 16 February 2018 - Szklarska Poręba (1881)
 24 August 2018 - Gdańsk
 22 February 2019 - Szklarska Poręba (1934)
 7 June 2019 - Charlotte's Valley/Ustka (1949)
 28 June 2019 - Zakopane (1952)
 9 August 2019 - Stalowa Wola (1958)
 16 August 2019 - Zamość (1959)
 30 August 2019 - Kraków (1961), together with Piotr Baron 
 6 September 2019 - Chorzów (1962) 
 11 October 2019 - Polanica Zdrój (1967)
 21 February 2020 - Szklarska Poręba (1986)

Marek Niedźwiecki The Traveller & Photographer 

In his free time Marek Niedźwiecki likes travelling. His most favourite destinations now are Australia and Jizera Mountains, but he also mentions India as the place when he felt "at home". Altogether, the most often visited places are The USA (especially Chicago), France (especially Corsica), The Netherlands and Germany.

Foreign journeys:
 Czechoslovakia,  (school trip)
 German Democratic Republic,  (school trip)
 The Union of Soviet Socialist Republic,  (school trip)
 German Democratic Republic, summer 1973 
 Yugoslavia, summer 1974
 Yugoslavia, summer 1975
 Hungary, in the 70s
 The Netherlands, summer 1976 
 Italy, August/September 1977
 The Netherlands, autumn 1979
 Bulgaria, September 1982
 Romania,  September 1982
 Bulgaria, September 1983
 Czechoslovakia, July 1984
 Bulgaria, September 1984
 India, Malesia, Singapur, Nepal, October/November 1984
 Austria, May/June 1985
 The Union of Soviet Socialist Republics, July/August 1985
 Bulgaria, September 1985
 Germany, January 1986
 Thailand, Malesia, Singapur, India, January - March 1986
 The UK, August 1986
 Bulgaria, August/September 1986
 Germany, September 1986
 Germany, January 1987
 France, January/February 1987
 The Netherlands, May/June 1987
 The USA, August - October 1987
 France, January 1988
 Czechoslovakia, March 1988
 Austria, May 1988
 The Netherlands, June 1988
 The Union of Soviet Socialist Republics, October/November 1988
 Singapur, Thailand, March/April 1989
 The Netherlands, June 1989
 Belgium, June 1989
 The Union of Soviet Socialist Republics, October 1989
 Greece, October 1989
 Turkey, October 1989
 France, January 1990
 The Union of Soviet Socialist Republics, January 1990
 The Netherlands, June 1990
 Belgium, June 1990
 Bulgaria, August 1990
 The Netherlands, September 1990
 France, January 1991
 The Netherlands, May 1991
 Germany, August 1991
 The Netherlands, September 1991
 Corsica, November 1991
 Corsica, May 1992
 Germany, June 1992
 The USA, June/July 1992
 The USA, December/January 1993
 Corsica, May 1993
 The USA, August 1993
 Denmark, September 1993
 The Netherlands, November 1993
 Germany, November 1993
 France, January 1994
 Corsica, May 1994
 France, June 1994
 France, October 1994
 The USA, December/January 1995
 Australia, January/February 1995
 The UK, April 1995
 Canada, October 1995
 Italy, December 1995
 The Netherlands, 1996
 Australia, December/January 1996
 France, January 1996
 France, February 1996
 The UK, March 1996
 Corsica, May 1996
 The UK, August 1996
 Austria, August 1996
 The USA, September 1996
 Canada, September 1996
 Jamaica, November 1996
 Mexico, April 1997
 The USA, May 1997
 Canada, May 1997
 Monaco, July 1997
 The UK, August/September 1997
 The USA, November 1997
 Austria, November 1997
 Australia, December/January 1998
 Austria, March 1998
 The USA, April 1998 
 France, April 1998
 The Netherlands, June 1998
 The USA,August 1998
 The Netherlands, November 1998
 Thailand, November/December 1998
 The USA, August 1999
 Canada, August 1999
 The Netherlands, August 1999
 Kenya, September/October 1999
 The USA, October 1999
 The Netherlands, May 2000
 Canada, June 2000
 The USA, October 2000
 The UK, November 2000
 Australia, December/January 2001
 New Zealand, December/January 2001
 The Netherlands, February 2001
 The Netherlands, July 2001
 The UK, July 2001
 Portugal, October 2001
 Germany, January 2002
 Germany, February 2002 
 Canada, February 2002
 The USA, August 2002
 Germany, December 2002
 Australia, December/January 2003
 New Zealand, December/January 2003
 The USA, February 2003
 Corsica, September 2003
 The UK, October 2003
 Corsica, May 2004
 The USA, October 2005
 Australia, December/January 2005
 New Zealand, December/January 2005
 Australia, March 2006
 Australia, February/March 2007
 Australia, October/November 2007
 The USA, August 2008
 The Czech Republic, May 2009
 Australia, July/August 2009
 The Netherlands, November 2009
 The USA, January/February 2010
 The Czech Republic, March 2010
 Italy, March 2010
 Australia, December/January 2011
 Corsica, September 2011
 India, October/November 2011
 Germany, October 2013
 The Czech Republic, October 2013
 Australia, July/August 2014
 Ireland, September 2014
 Belgium, October 2014
 Spain, March 2015
 Croatia, June/July 2016
 Australia, September/November 2016 
 The Netherlands, March 2017
 Spain, March 2017
 USA, September/October 2017
 Spain, March 2018
 USA, August 2018 
 Corsica, September 2018
 The Netherlands, June 2019 (The Eagles concert)
 London, UK, July 2019 (Barbra Streisand concert) 
 Barcelona, Spain, October/November 2019

Australia 

"My Australia started in a way from the fact that in 1964, a family from Szadek was emigrating to Australia. It was a big event in my little town, someone going there for ever." says Marek Niedźwiecki. He also mentions the film "Wife for the Australian" with Elżbieta Czyżewska and Wiesław Gołas  and friendship with Lucia Mlodzianowsky (who was his pen friend while he was a student and who used to send him records with Australian music) as the reasons for his love for Australia.

When asked about his favourite places in Australia, Marek Niedźwiecki usually says that it changes slightly with every journey. In 2008 he created his own Australia Top Ten, which included: Uluru, Kata Tjuta, Tasmania, The Pinnacles Desert, Fraser Island, Twelve Apostles Marine National Park on Great Ocean Road, Sydney, Melbourne, Blue Mountains, Lucky Bay, Great Ocean Drive and Wave Rock. A few years later the list changed only in one position: Wave Rock was replaced by Kimberley, which now Marek Niedźwiecki mentions just after Uluru.

His first journey to Australia took place in January 1995. He was invited by four  local Polish radio stations (in Adelaide, Perth, Sydney, Melbourne) for four weeks and he was supposed to be a DJ there, which turned out to be rather meetings with the Poles living there. Marek Niedźwiecki made many friends and came back Down Under twelve times so far, as a turist. He usually spends there four to six weeks, since he claims it's not worth coming for a shorter period of time because of the distance between Poland and Australia and the discomforts of travelling.

From every journey Marek Niedźwiecki brings many photos which he publishes on his blog http://www.marekniedzwiecki.pl/ . Since 11 March 2009 a collection of his photographs has been travelling through Poland. Organized by Muzeum Ziemi Lubuskiej, the exhibition consists of 50 photos, chosen by the museum staff  from the 200 suggested by the author. The exhibition was presented in numerous Polish cities such as Zielona Góra, Bydgoszcz, Kutno, Turek, Rybnik, Radomsko, Koszalin, Nekla or Inowrocław.

Szklarska Poręba 

Marek Niedźwiecki says that he has left part of his heart in Jizera Mountains. He usually stays in Szklarska Poręba: "I fell in love with her around the same time I fell in love with Australia [...]. It was the second half of the 90s. I started going there on business. Szklarska became the summer and winter capital of Polish Radio Three. And then I was lost. Like it happens in love. […] I have my favourite places, walks, routes… I can do it many times and it is never boring. […] My house will be there, because it is already my place."

Walking in Karkonosze Mountains and Jizera Mountains Marek Niedźwiecki also takes a lot of photos which he then shows on his blog. In February 2015 in Szklarska Poręba he opened his exhibition of mountain photos called "Dream Mountains".
On 7 January 2013 he was awarded the statuette of Rübezahl (Polish: Liczyrzepa, Karkonosz) who is a folklore mountain spirit of Karkonosze Mountains. "How is this possible? It's the prize for love, the joy of being there and the pleasure of talking and writing about Szklarska Poręba, Jakuszyce, The Jizera Mountains. I feel appreciated."

Records, Films, Books, Blog 

Apart from being a radio freak and a traveller, Marek Niedźwiecki puts together thematic song collections, is a writer and occasionally appears in films.

Records 

Collections:
 18 records: Lista Przebojów Programu III 1982–1998 (1998–2001)
 19 records: Marek Niedźwiecki zaprasza do... Smooth Jazz Cafe 1–19 (1999–2019) & Marek Niedźwiecki przedstawia – The Best of Smooth Jazz Cafe (2008)
 25 records: 25 lat Listy Przebojów Trójki 1982–2006 (2006–2007)
 5 records: Złota Trójka 1982–2006 (2007)
 13 records: 30 lat Listy Przebojów Trójki 2007–2011 (2012)
 6 records: Muzyka ciszy (2013- 2019)

Single projects:
 5-ka Listy Przebojów Trójki (1987)
 Top Rock - przeboje Trójki (1990)
 Moja lista marzeń (1992)
 Chillout Cafe (2004)
 Piosenki z dzwoneczkami poleca Marek Niedźwiecki (2007)
 Marek Niedźwiecki prezentuje – Smooth Festival "Złote Przeboje" Bydgoszcz 2009 (2009)
 Perły z Listy Przebojów Programu Trzeciego (2012)
 Moja lista marzeń 2 (2012)
 Radio California (1 July 2016)
 "Marek i Marek Niedźwiecki Sierocki" (19 October 2018)

Films 

 Historia polskiego rocka (2008, dokumentary, directed by Leszek Gnoiński, Wojciech Słota)
 Beats of Freedom – Zew wolności (2009, dokumentary, directed by Leszek Gnoiński, Wojciech Słota)
 Listy do M. (2011)
 Ostatnia rodzina (2016)

Books 

 Lista Przebojów Programu Trzeciego: 1982–1994 (Wyd. Wacław Bagiński, Wrocław 1996)
 Lista Przebojów Trójki 1994–2006 (Prószyński i S-ka, Warszawa 2007)
 Nie wierzę w życie pozaradiowe (Agora, Warszawa 2011) 
 Radiota czyli skąd się biorą Niedźwiedzie (Wielka Litera, Warszawa 2014)
 Australijczyk (Wielka Litera, Warszawa, 4 November 2015)
 DyrdyMarki (Wielka Litera, Warszawa, 2 September 2020)

Blog 

Marek Niedźwiecki started writing his blog on 14 October 2007 with the assumption that it will be a kind of travel journal (he was just leaving for Australia). "There it is! There it is! There it is! Although I was sure it will never happen. My own blog on the internet is now operational so that I could write this diary-nightery from Down Under." – he began his first post, also mentioning that he will not be writing about himself, which promise, fortunately, he doesn’t keep.

The posts usually appear on Mondays, Thursdays and Saturdays, the latter one including Marek Niedźwiecki's private charts, which he has been writing down since 1975 and since 2008 on the blog.

As for the number of posts, the worst was the month of October 2011 when only 5 posts appeared, the best - November 2007 with 25 posts. Usually, there are about 12 – 13 posts a month.

Almost always there are several photos attached, their number varying from one to 43.

Post number 1000 appeared on 8 December 2014 and was titled "Gdynia w occie".

Photograph number 33333 appeared on 14 March 2016 and was titled "Panie Kierowniku!"

Useful links 

 Marek's blog http://www.marekniedzwiecki.pl/ 
 Official Fanpage http://www.lpmn.pl/ 
 Polish Radio Three http://www.polskieradio.pl/9,Trojka 
 The Charts Archive http://alp3.pl/alpt.phtml 
 Facebook https://www.facebook.com/marek.niedzwiecki.169 
 Matras Bookshop interview https://www.youtube.com/watch?v=zxokt4k_6Us 
 Interview for my3miasto https://www.youtube.com/watch?v=AKgnaGBUzus
 Xięgarnia interview https://www.youtube.com/watch?v=op0IU870MlQ
 Film "The Grey Bear" https://www.youtube.com/watch?v=unTxWjIxigA
 Online interview "Videogaduła" https://www.youtube.com/watch?v=09r2tM3NJVI
 ASP Przystanek Woodstock interview https://www.youtube.com/watch?v=5DfyyD3U51A

References

1954 births
Living people
Music journalists